Mikhail Yurievich German (23 February 19337 May 2018) was a Soviet and Russian writer, art historian, doctor of art criticism, professor, and member of the International Association of Art Critics (AICA), International Council of Museums (ICOM), International PEN Club, Union of Russian Writers, Union of Journalists of St. Petersburg and the International Federation of Journalists (IFJ). He was a leading researcher at the Russian Museum.

Father - Yuri Pavlovich German, mother - Lyudmila Vladimirovna (née Reysler), brother - (by father) Alexey Herman.

Wife - Natalia Viktorovna Chernova-Herman.

In 1957 he graduated from the Leningrad Institute of Painting, Sculpture and Architecture.

Awards 

 Tsarskoselskaya art award (2007) 
 Prize "Nevsky Prospekt"
 Prize of the Government of St. Petersburg in the category of "prose" for the book "The Elusive Paris".

Bibliography

Selected books 

Mikhail Herman is the author of over 50 books and numerous publications in print media devoted to the problems of the history and contemporary development of art.

 Podlaski (1959)
 Daumier, Honore (1962)
 David (1964)
 On Seven Hills (1965)
 Hogarth (1971)
 Leonid Semyonovich Khizhinsky (1972)
 Antwerp. Gent. Brugge (1974)
 William Hogarth and his time (1977)
 Antoine Watteau (1980)
 The Universe of the Painter (1982)

Articles 
 Georgy Kovenchuk (Exhibition catalog. "Matisse Club"). — St. Petersburg: Mathis Club. 2005. — 32 p. [without pagination]. (Rus).

References

1933 births
2018 deaths
Academic staff of Herzen University
Writers from Saint Petersburg